Gazella borbonica, commonly known as the Bourbon gazelle or European gazelle, is an extinct gazelle which existed in Europe during the Pleistocene epoch. It was described by Charles Depéret in 1884.

It had rather long, moderately divergent and slightly recurved horns and was about the same size as the modern Dorcas Gazelle, with a shoulder height of about 60 cm.

Fossil remains have been found in France, the Netherlands and south-east England. Taxonomic synonyms include Gazella anglica Newton, 1884 and Gazella daviesii Hinton, 1906.

References 

Mammals described in 1884
Gazella
Fossil taxa described in 1884
Pleistocene even-toed ungulates
Pleistocene mammals of Europe
Prehistoric bovids